Tuturqan (also Romanized as Tūtūrqān; also known as Tūtūrqānlu) is a village in Qeshlaqat-e Afshar Rural District of Afshar District of Khodabandeh County, Zanjan province, Iran. At the 2006 National Census, its population was 445 in 84 households. The following census in 2011 counted 315 people in 87 households. The latest census in 2016 showed a population of 189 people in 99 households; it was the largest village in its rural district.

References 

Khodabandeh County

Populated places in Zanjan Province

Populated places in Khodabandeh County